Pathfinder Parkway is a  walking, jogging and biking trail that traverses Bartlesville, Oklahoma.

This  paved pathway, for walking, jogging and biking, runs mostly along the Caney River and Turkey Creek, connecting Johnstone Park, Robinwood Park, Jo Allyn Lowe Park, Sooner Park, Bartlesville High School, the Wesleyan Church, and Eastland Shopping Center, at the corner of Hwy 75 and Frank Phillips Blvd.

Former city planner Joel Smith originally planned for Pathfinder to run along both sides of the Caney River and to connect to Circle Mountain. 

The Pathfinder Parkway bridge, originally built in 1996, has been restored in the 2010s in part through local donations. Donors are recognized by having their names (or a dedication) engraved in one of the 235 wooden planks that make up the walkway of the bridge.

Timeline 
 Designed by Joel Smith
 Original pathway constructed in 1976
 Designated as a National Recreation Trail in 1977
 Bridge rebuilt in 1996, restored 2012
 Extended in 1999

External links
Bartlesville Park Dept.
Interactive Google Map 
Path info and downloadable map 
George Miksch Sutton Avian Research Center This non-profit research and conservation organization installed 12 full color, interpretive signs along two miles of the trail north of Jo Allyn Lowe Park describing birds that can be seen along the trail.
 Bartlesville Pedalers Bicyclers are frequent users of the path.

Bike paths in Oklahoma
Bartlesville, Oklahoma